Adriana Fabbri Seroni, commonly known as Adriana Seroni (9 June 1922 – 9 April 1984) was an Italian journalist and politician of the Communist Party, member of the Italian Chamber of Deputies from 1972 to 1984.

Biography 

Seroni was born in Florence on 9 June 1922. She finished her degree on humanities and became a journalist. As a journalist, she defended women's rights. In 1972, she became a Chamber of Deputies member for the Italian Communist Party. She was a deputy and a journalist until her death in 1984.

Bibliography 
 Adriana Seroni, La questione femminile in Italia, 1970-1977, Editori Riuniti
 Idem, Donne comuniste: identità e confronto, Rome: C. Salemi, 1984
 Massimo d'Alema, A Mosca l'ultima volta: Enrico Berlinguer e il 1984, Editore Donzelli

Notes

External links 
 About Adriana Seroni in the Official Website of Italian Chamber of Deputies
 Adriana Seroni's pictures on the historical archive of l'Unità

1922 births
1984 deaths
Politicians from Florence
Journalists from Florence
Italian Communist Party politicians
Deputies of Legislature VI of Italy
Deputies of Legislature VII of Italy
Deputies of Legislature VIII of Italy
Deputies of Legislature IX of Italy
20th-century Italian women politicians
Italian women journalists
20th-century Italian women writers
Communist women writers
Socialist feminists
20th-century Italian journalists
Women members of the Chamber of Deputies (Italy)